Nathan Armand Pacheco is an American tenor singer and songwriter of Brazilian origin. He was a featured vocalist during the 2009 tour for "Yanni Voices", produced by Walt Disney Records and is currently signed to the Disney Pearl Series sub-label.

Biography
After spending his youth in Northern Virginia and graduating from Oakton High School, Pacheco graduated from the music program of Brigham Young University, and also followed his love of culture and languages by continuing his education abroad in South America and Europe. Pacheco spent over two years in Brazil as a missionary for the Church of Jesus Christ of Latter-day Saints, being immersed in its culture and allowing its influence to contribute to his musical development. He eventually traveled throughout Brazil, performing both classical as well as some of Brazil's cultural music.

He also spent time in Italy, studying the language while performing with the Opera Festival of Lucca. In all of these adventures to different countries, he was relentless in his efforts to learn the languages. The result is his ability to speak and compose in English, Portuguese, Italian, and Spanish.

Career
After auditioning for producer Ric Wake, who then introduced him to Yanni, Pacheco began putting lyrics and additional music to some of Yanni's most famous works, such as "Adagio", "Tribute", "Almost a Whisper", "Enchantment", "Secret Vows" and "In the Mirror". Upon completion of the recordings with Yanni, Pacheco gained national attention as the featured performer in two PBS television specials, which have been broadcast throughout 2008 through 2010. Pacheco then joined Yanni and his orchestra as a featured performer on a 100 concert tour throughout Latin America, Canada and the United States. He has twice been a performer on the national broadcast of Disney Parks Christmas Day Parade on ABC - in 2010 (with Yanni) and 2011 (with Katherine Jenkins, only).

In 2009, Pacheco relocated to Southern California after being signed to the Disney Pearl Series label and has been writing the songs that will make up his debut solo album. Pacheco has collaborated with many writers under the direction of producer/composer Leo - Z (Andrea Bocelli, Josh Groban). For his album, Pacheco recorded with the Philharmonia Orchestra in London at Air Studios.

In 2011, Pacheco did the operatic bridge for the song "Let's Talk About Me" from The Muppets and performed in Chicago's Magnificent Mile Lights Festival Parade and the Philadelphia Thanksgiving Parade. He also performed at the British Embassy in Washington D.C. for H.R.H. Prince Charles honoring British and American soldiers in May 2011.

In 2012, Pacheco joined Welsh mezzo- soprano Katherine Jenkins and the National Symphony Orchestra as a special guest on her 28 date UK tour in January and February, with more shows to come in December in the UK. In March, he performed in front of the Washington Monument as part of the Centennial Celebration of the National Cherry Blossom Festival in Washington D.C.
The PBS special Introducing Nathan Pacheco began airing on PBS stations throughout the United States on August 11, 2012. Pacheco released his self-titled debut album on September 18, 2012, and embarked on his first headlining tour in November 2012 with concerts in Chicago, Hartford, Fort Lauderdale, San Diego, Salt Lake City, and Washington, D.C. On July 24, 2013 Pacheco did a performance with the Mormon Tabernacle Choir.

Pacheco is a member of The Church of Jesus Christ of Latter-day Saints (LDS Church), and served a mission for the LDS Church in the Campinas Brazil Mission from 1999-2001 before attending BYU.

On 10 February 2017 Pacheco released an album of religious music entitled Higher.

Pacheco and his wife Katie are the parents of three children, two boys and a girl.

Albums discography

Notes

Singles discography
"O Holy Night" with Chloe (2009)
"O Holy Night" with Katherine Jenkins (2011)
"Questa O Quella" (2014)
"The Prayer" with David Archuleta (2015)
"Perfect" with David Archuleta

References

Sources
"Nathan Pacheco, rising star in world of classical crossover", Washington Post Nov. 8, 2012

External links 
 

Living people
American people of Brazilian descent
American tenors
Musicians from Washington, D.C.
Walt Disney Records artists
Brigham Young University alumni
Latter Day Saints from Virginia
Latter Day Saints from Utah
Oakton High School alumni
American expatriates in Italy
Year of birth missing (living people)